Galgate railway station served the village of Galgate in Lancashire, England.

References

Disused railway stations in Lancaster
Railway stations in Great Britain opened in 1840
Railway stations in Great Britain closed in 1939
Former London and North Western Railway stations